Oasis were an English rock band from Manchester. Formed in 1991, the group originally included vocalist Liam Gallagher, guitarist Paul "Bonehead" Arthurs, bassist Paul "Guigsy" McGuigan and drummer Tony McCarroll, although the quartet were soon joined by guitarist and second vocalist Noel Gallagher, older brother of Liam. They released their debut album Definitely Maybe in 1994, the material for which was entirely written by Noel Gallagher. Standalone single "Whatever" was issued later in the year, which was later co-credited to Neil Innes due to plagiarism. The band's second album (What's the Story) Morning Glory?, their first with new drummer Alan White, followed in 1995. All songs were again credited to Noel Gallagher, although opening track "Hello" was co-credited to Gary Glitter and Mike Leander due to its use of lyrics from Glitter's single "Hello, Hello, I'm Back Again". Oasis released their third album Be Here Now in 1997, which was their last to be written entirely by Noel Gallagher.

Bonehead and Guigsy both left Oasis in 1999, leaving the Gallagher brothers and White to record the band's next album alone. Standing on the Shoulder of Giants was released in 2000, featuring the first song written by Liam Gallagher for the band, "Little James". After adding new band members Gem Archer on guitar and Andy Bell on bass, the group released Heathen Chemistry in 2002, which featured songwriting contributions from all band members except White, including the first single not written by Noel Gallagher (Liam's "Songbird"). White left in 2004, with the Who touring drummer Zak Starkey taking his place as an unofficial member. Don't Believe the Truth was released in 2005, with both Gallaghers, Archer and Bell all writing songs for the album again. Noel Gallagher's "Who Put the Weight of the World on My Shoulders?" was contributed to the soundtrack for the film Goal! in 2006, and the following year "Lord Don't Slow Me Down" was released as a single from the film of the same name.

Oasis released their latest album Dig Out Your Soul in 2008, which featured six songs written by Noel Gallagher, three by Liam Gallagher, and one each by Archer and Bell. Starkey was replaced by Chris Sharrock after the album was recorded. After a confrontation with Liam backstage, Noel Gallagher announced his departure from Oasis in August 2009, with the remaining members forming Beady Eye together the following year.

Songs

See also
Oasis discography

References

External links
Oasis official website
List of Oasis songs at AllMusic

Oasis